The Ekiti State Executive Council (informally, the Cabinet of Ekiti State) is the highest formal governmental body that plays important roles in the Government of Ekiti State headed by the Governor of Ekiti State. It consists of the Deputy Governor of Ekiti State, Secretary to the State Government, Chief of Staff, Commissioners who preside over ministerial departments, and the Governor's special aides.

Functions
The Executive Council exists to advise and direct the Governor. Their appointment as members of the Executive Council gives them the authority to execute power over their fields.

Current cabinet
The current Executive Council is serving under the Biodun Oyebanji administration.

References

Ekiti
Politics of Ekiti State